Professionalization and institutionalization of history is a term used in historiography to describe the process of professionalization of the historical discipline with historians becoming professionals through process of special education, and genesis of historical institutions they founded.

Professionalization of history 
During the process of the professionalization of history, being a historian became not only an occupation but a profession. Professionalization of history is the process of acquiring the following characteristics of profession for occupation of historian:
 prolonged training in definable body of knowledge,
 a credential system,
 a code of ethics,
 a self-government
 legislated access to particular labour market.

This process results with privileged access to financial and social rewards for its members.

Institutionalization of history 
The term institutionalisation is widely used in social theory to refer to the process of embedding something (for example a concept, a social role, a particular value or mode of behaviour) within an organisation, social system, or society as a whole.

See also 
 Professionalization
 Institutionalization

References

External links 
 
 

Historiography